Dimitri Logothetis is a Greek-American actor, director, comedian, and producer.

Early life
Logothetis was born in Athens, Greece, and immigrated to the United States of America at the age of six with his mother, Anna, and his father, Euthymios. Euthymios moved to the United States to join his family, Dimitri's father spent eight years working as a mechanic in Los Angeles and became an American citizen.

Logothetis attended Beverly Vista Grammar School and Lawndale High School in the Los Angeles South Bay area where he played football and ran track.

Career
In his last year at Loyola, Logothetis was hired by Capitol Records to record the US tour of the rock band The Knack. He was then hired by Columbia Pictures to produce his first film, Hardbodies 2.

In 1987, he directed his first feature film for New World Pictures, Pretty Smart, starred by Patricia Arquette, and developed a horror film, Slaughterhouse Rock, for United Artists. In 1989 he made a documentary about five heavyweight boxers who dominated the sport in their time, Champions Forever, with Muhammad Ali and Joe Frazier.

Danny Aiello then came to Logothetis with a stage play, Wheel Barrel Closers, which Logothetis adapted for the screen and directed under the title The Closer, starring Aiello, Diane Baker and Michael Paré. He then acquired the rights to a Stephen King script written specifically for the screen, and produced Sleepwalkers for Columbia Pictures.

In 1994, Logothetis directed and produced Body Shot, a film noir thriller starring Robert Patrick, for HBO. He then moved into the Western genre and produced and directed Cheyenne, starring Bo Svensen and Gary Hudson.

In 1999, Logothetis was hired by Warner Brothers and directed the pilot for the television series Robin Hood.

He directed Mike Hammer, starring Stacy Keach, for Franklin Waterman. He then directed the pilot episode for the action adventure series Air America, starring Lorenzo Lamas, and went on to direct eight more episodes.

In 2000, Logothetis was hired by Warner Brothers to be the executive producer of the science fiction action adventure TV series Code Name: Eternity. He was responsible for the creative look and feel of the series and for writing and directing the pilot episode. The next year, Warner Brothers asked him to serve as executive producer and to direct another TV anthology, The Dark Realm, where he edited the two-hour pilot episode and supervised the screenwriting.

In 2010, Logothetis became President of Production at Kings Road Entertainment, which had previously made The Best of Times with Robin Williams, Kickboxer with Jean-Claude Van Damme, and All of Me with Steve Martin. He then re-developed and wrote a series called The Outfit, again based on Giancana, that he set up with Radar Pictures and producer Ted Field. He then set up a remake of All of Me with John Davis and DreamWorks, which he is set to produce. Dreamworks let the option on All of Me expire and Logothetis teamed up with Todd Garner to set up All of Me as a TV series at NBC Universal.

In 2013, Logothetis took up Giancana again, and along with his project partner Nick Celozzi, wrote, produced and directed a documentary on him, Momo: The Sam Giancana Story, which won the 2012 Hollywood Reel Independent Film Festival "Best Feature Documentary" award. In 2015, he produced Kickboxer: Vengeance, a reboot of the Kickboxer franchise, with Ted Field and Radar Pictures.

Logothetis wrote and produced Kickboxer: Vengeance starring Jean-Claude Van Damme and the new kickboxer, Alain Moussi, with other talents such as Dave Bautista, Georges Saint-Pierre, and Gina Carano. Logothetis was attracted to the original Jean-Claude Van Damme's Kickboxer because of his martial arts background and that's what inspired him to pursue the rights to the original, develop a reboot of the franchise and ultimately write, produce and direct a contemporary version of the pop culture, iconic Kickboxer. It was important that Logothetis to convince Van Damme to step into the role of mentor to ordain a new, high octane Kickboxer who has a sixth degree black belt in Jiu-Jitsu, Alain Moussi.

In 2016, Logothetis wrote and directed the sequel, Kickboxer: Retaliation, which introduced new characters played by Hafþór Júlíus Björnsson and Christopher Lambert. Kickboxer: Retaliation received mixed reviews. According to Men's Health, during the week of September 29, 2020, Kickboxer: Vengeance film was in the top 15 most viewed action films on Netflix.

2020 saw the release of Dimitri's science fiction martial arts film Jiu Jitsu starring Alain Moussi, Nicolas Cage, and Tony Jaa. Jiu Jitsu is the beginning of a new martial arts franchise.

Future projects
Dimitri has acquired the rights to Man of War, a Gary Scott Thompson original screenplay. Gary wrote and created the six-billion-dollar Fast and Furious Universal Pictures film franchise. Dimitri is developing two other Kings properties as well, All of Me, a remake of the original film that starred Steve Martin and Lilly Tomlin, and The Best of Times, a remake of the original film that starred Kurt Russell and Robin Williams. Dimitri is producing these projects with Todd Garner, former President of production of Disney. Dimitri is also in the pre-production process for the third and final film in his Kickboxer reboot trilogy, Kickboxer: Armageddon, as well as a sequel to Jiu Jitsu.

References

External links
 Dimitrilogothetis.com
 
 DL Yahoo @ Ca.movies.yahoo.com
 New York Times Champions
 Kingsroadentertainment.com
 Hollywood Reporter Kickboxer Retaliation
 Forbes Kickboxer Retaliation
 Kung Fu Kingdom Interview
 KICKBOXER: RETALIATION TRAILER

American film directors
American film producers
American male screenwriters
American people of Greek descent
Living people
Year of birth missing (living people)